Sagda epistylioides is a species of air-breathing land snail, a terrestrial pulmonate gastropod mollusk in the family Sagdidae.

Distribution 
This species occurs in Jamaica.

References

 Discover Life info

Sagdidae
Gastropods described in 1821